Sari Abboud (born December 10, 1980), better known by his stage name Massari, is a Lebanese Canadian R&B pop recording artist. His music combines Middle Eastern culture with western culture. He started his musical career in 2001–2002, and has released three albums, Massari in 2005, Forever Massari in 2009 and Tune In in 2018. He has had a number of hit singles in Canada, his home country of Lebanon, the Middle East, Europe, and internationally. He is managed by SAL&CO.

Early life and education 
He was born in Beirut, Lebanon. His family relocated to Montreal, Quebec when he was 11 years old. At the age of 13, he and his younger brothers moved to Ottawa, Ontario, where he attended Hillcrest High School.

Musical career 
He started his musical career in 2001-2002 adopting the stage name Massari, which in Lebanese, Massari means "money". The chosen name is also reminiscent of his birth name Sari. His cultural and social upbringing shaped his musical style very early in his music career. He released his first song "Spitfire" (2002) which was aired on Ottawa radio stations. Since then, Massari has been steadily writing and developing his sound.

2005-2007: Debut self-titled album and success with CP Records 
After three years of preparation, he released a self-titled album Massari on CP Records. His debut album resulted in four singles, receiving Gold certification in Canada, and he continued to have international success in Europe, Asia, the Middle East. Two of his early singles "Be Easy" and "Real Love" besides being two of his major hits in Canada, cracking the Canadian Top 10, they also charted notably in the German Singles Chart. Based on his initial success, Massari signed a record deal with independent record label, CP Records, becoming the prominent successful performing artist for the record company alongside rapper Belly. On November 14, 2007, Massari and his record label, CP Records, came to a mutual agreement to end their relationship.

2009-2010: Forever Massari and signing with Universal 
During 2009, he released two tracks from the forthcoming album, namely "Bad Girl" and "Body Body". The album itself Forever Massari was officially released on Universal Records Canada on 10 November 2009. It included songs by writers and producers like Rupert Gayle, Alex Greggs, Derek Brin, Rob Wells and Justin Forsley.

2011-2013: Signing again with CP and Hero EP
In summer of 2011, Massari signed again with CP Records, after five years of his departure from the label. On June 20, 2012, Massari realized there was money to be made off of the Middle Eastern ethnic audience, and released a free single called "Full Circle" featuring Belly as the lead single from his first EP Hero. Massari's second single for the EP, called "Brand New Day", was released on July 1, 2012 (Canada Day). Massari shot the video in Miami with Canadian director RT!. In January 2013, "Brand New Day" went Gold in Canada. It also charted on the Austrian Ö3 Austria Top 40, German Media Control Charts and Swiss Hitparade. The third single from the EP, "Shisha", features French Montana. It was released on May 21, 2013.

2017-present: Tune In 
On March 24, 2017, Massari released a brand new song "So Long" along with a music video featuring former Miss Universe Pia Wurtzbach. It is the first single from his third album Tune In. The album contains features from Tory Lanez, Beenie Man, Shaggy, Afrojack and producer DaHeala. On March 31, 2017, a follow-up single "Done Da Da" was released along with a music video which received over 7.2 million views within 3 weeks on Vevo.

Artistry

Influences 
Massari is fluent in English, Arabic, and French. He has been exposed to a wide variety of music styles. He says his biggest influence is George Wassouf Massari says, "I sing from my heart and George Wassouf taught me to do that."

Many of Massari's songs are influenced by his Middle-Eastern origins. Most of his songs contain Middle-Eastern Arabic melodies. Massari says, "Because of my background, my music is heavily influenced by Middle-Eastern melodies. Over the past few years so many artists are trying to bring Arabic styles into their music, but mine is authentic." Massari sings and raps about women. "My music is made for the ladies because that's where I get my inspiration. You'll notice a lot of the music is upbeat and positive. Women give off so much energy; it's hard not to be inspired by them."

Music style 
A large portion of Massari's work incorporates elements of both singing and rapping, depending on whether or not another artist is featured on the track. Overall, Massari incorporates elements of R&B, hip hop, and pop in his music.

Discography

Studio albums

Extended plays

DVDs
2006: Massari: Road to Success

Singles

Guest appearances

Awards/nominations 
 2005: Much Music Video Awards : Best Independent Video (Nominated)
 2005: Much Vibe Best Rap Video (Nominated)
 2005: Canadian Urban Music Awards : Best New Artist and R&B/Soul Recording of the Year (Nominated)
 2006: Much Music Award : Best Director (Nominated)
 2006: Best Cinematography (Nominated)
 2006: Best Pop Video "Be easy" (Won)
 2006: Best Independent Video "Be Easy" (Nominated)
 2006: People's Choice Favorite Canadian Artist (Nominated)
 2006: Juno Award R&B/Soul Recording of the Year (Nominated)
 2013: SIRIUSXM Indie Awards Dance Artist of the Year (Won)
 2014: Murex d'Or : World Class  Celebrities Of Lebanon Origin (Won)
 2018: Massari & Mohammed Assaf - Roll With It

Citations 
Ottawa Citizen: "Back with a splash: Rebuilding the Massari empire"
BlackBeatsFM Interview with Massari (German)
Metro News Toronto: Forever or nothing
Star Phoenix: Rebuilding Massari empire
PlanetUrban (Australia) interview with Massari
Naked Eye video interview with Massari

References

External links 

Official YouTube page
Official Facebook page

1980 births
Living people
21st-century Canadian male singers
21st-century Canadian rappers
21st-century Lebanese male singers
Canadian contemporary R&B singers
Canadian hip hop singers
Canadian male rappers
Canadian male singers
Canadian pop singers
Canadian songwriters
English-language singers from Lebanon
Hillcrest High School (Ottawa) alumni
Lebanese emigrants to Canada
Lebanese pop singers
Lebanese rappers
Musicians from Beirut
Musicians from Ottawa
Singers from Montreal
Universal Records artists